James R. Turnesa (December 9, 1912 – August 27, 1971) was an American professional golfer and winner of the 1952 PGA Championship, beating Chick Harbert 1-up in the match-play final. He was one of seven famous golfing brothers; Phil (1896–1987), Frank (1898–1949), Joe (1901–1991), Mike (1907–2000), Doug (1909–1972), Jim (1912–1971), and Willie (1914–2001). The family was referred to as a "golf dynasty" in a 2000 New York Times article.

Career
Turnesa was born in Elmsford, New York, one of seven brothers who became prominent in the golfing world: Phil (1896–1987), Frank (1898–1949), Joe (1901–1991), Mike (1907–2000), Doug (1909–1972), Jim (1912–1971), and Willie (1914–2001). All but Willie turned professional and Jim was the only one to win a major championship.

The Turnesa brothers were well known for their prowess on the links and they started out as caddies before competing in tournaments. Jim's father Vitale was a head greenskeeper at Fairview Country Club. It was at Fairview that Jim and his brothers would apprentice under the head pro John R. Inglis. So famous did they become as a dynasty of the sport that RKO Pictures filmed a newsreel about them in 1938 labeling the clip "The Golfing Brothers."

Turnesa faced and lost to Sam Snead in the 1942 PGA Championship final. In 1948, he held the record for low score (280) in the U.S. Open for about an hour. Ben Hogan (276) and Jimmy Demaret (278) finished later, erasing his record, and he finished third. He won one other PGA Tour event, the 1951 Reading Open.

He was a frequent participant in Westchester member-pro events beating out a duo that included Gene Sarazen in 1947 at a Knollwood Country Club best ball tournament.

Turnesa played on the 1953 Ryder Cup team.

After serving as pro at Briar Hall and Empire State course, he was named the head pro at Ryewood Country Club in 1959 and continued there in the early 1960s.

Personal life
He died in his home town of lung cancer.

Professional wins (11)

PGA Tour wins (2)
1951 Reading Open
1952 PGA Championship

Major championship is shown in bold.

Other wins (9)
Note: This list may be incomplete.
1937 Rhode Island Open
1946 Westchester PGA Championship
1947 North and South Open
1950 Havana Invitational
1956 Westchester PGA Championship
1959 Metropolitan Open
1960 Haig & Haig Scotch Foursome (with Gloria Armstrong)
1964 Westchester PGA Championship
1968 Long Island PGA Championship

Major championships

Wins (1)

Note: The PGA Championship was match play until 1958

Results timeline

NT = no tournament
CUT = missed the half-way cut
R128, R64, R32, R16, QF, SF = round in which player lost in PGA Championship match play
"T" indicates a tie for a place

Summary

Most consecutive cuts made – 27 (1941 U.S. Open – 1956 PGA)
Longest streak of top-10s – 3 (1949 Masters – 1949 PGA)

U.S. national team appearances
Professional
Ryder Cup: 1953 (winners)
Canada Cup: 1953
Lakes International Cup: 1952 (winners)
Hopkins Trophy: 1953 (winners)

See also
List of men's major championships winning golfers

References

American male golfers
PGA Tour golfers
Ryder Cup competitors for the United States
Winners of men's major golf championships
Golfers from New York (state)
Sportspeople from New York City
Deaths from lung cancer in New York (state)
1912 births
1971 deaths